The Colony of Rhode Island and Providence Plantations was one of the original Thirteen Colonies established on the east coast of America, bordering the Atlantic Ocean. It was founded by Roger Williams. It was an English colony from 1636 until 1707, and then a colony of Great Britain until the American Revolution in 1776, when it became the State of Rhode Island and Providence Plantations.

Early America

The land that became the English colony was first home to the Narragansett Indians, which led to the name of the modern town of Narragansett, Rhode Island. European settlement began around 1622 with a trading post at Sowams, now the town of Warren, Rhode Island.

Roger Williams was a Puritan theologian and linguist who founded Providence Plantations in 1636 on land given to him by Narragansett sachem Canonicus.  He was exiled under religious persecution from the Massachusetts Bay Colony; he and his fellow settlers agreed on an egalitarian constitution providing for majority rule "in civil things" with liberty of conscience on spiritual matters. He named the settlement Providence Plantation, believing that God had brought them there.  (The term "plantation" was used in the 17th century to mean an agricultural colony.) Williams named the islands in the Narragansett Bay after Christian virtues: Patience, Prudence, and Hope Islands.

In 1637, another group of Massachusetts dissenters were allowed to settle on Aquidneck Island, which was called Rhode Island at the time, by Narragansett Sachems Canonicus and Miantonomi. They established a settlement called Pocasset at the northern end of the island. The group included William Coddington, John Clarke, and Anne and William Hutchinson, among others. That settlement, however, quickly split into two separate settlements. Samuel Gorton and others remained to establish the settlement of Portsmouth (which formerly was Pocasset) in 1638, while Coddington and Clarke established nearby Newport in 1639. Both settlements were situated on Rhode Island (Aquidneck).

The second plantation settlement on the mainland was Samuel Gorton's Shawomet Purchase from the Narragansetts in 1642. As soon as Gorton settled at Shawomet, however, the Massachusetts Bay authorities laid claim to his territory and acted to enforce their claim. After considerable difficulties with the Massachusetts Bay General Court, Gorton traveled to London to enlist the help of Robert Rich, 2nd Earl of Warwick, head of the Commission for Foreign Plantations. Gorton returned in 1648 with a letter from Rich, ordering Massachusetts to cease molesting him and his people. In gratitude, he changed the name of Shawomet Plantation to Warwick.

Cromwell interregnum
In 1651, William Coddington obtained a separate charter from England setting up the Coddington Commission, which made him life governor of the islands of Rhode Island and Conanicut in a federation with Connecticut Colony and Massachusetts Bay Colony. Protest, open rebellion, and a further petition to Oliver Cromwell in London led to the reinstatement of the original charter in 1653.

Sanctuary for religious freedom

Following the 1660 restoration of royal rule in England, it was necessary to gain a Royal Charter from King Charles II. Charles was a Catholic sympathizer in staunchly Protestant England, and he approved of the colony's promise of religious freedom. He granted the request with the Royal Charter of 1663, uniting the four settlements together into the Colony of Rhode Island and Providence Plantations. In the following years, many persecuted groups settled in the colony, notably Quakers and Jews. The Rhode Island colony was very progressive for the time, passing laws abolishing witchcraft trials, imprisonment for debt, and most capital punishment. The colony also passed the first anti-slavery law in America on May 18, 1652, though the practice remained widespread in Rhode Island and there exists no evidence that the legislation was ever enforced.

Rhode Island remained at peace with the Narragansett Indians, but the relationship was more strained between other New England colonies and certain tribes. This situation frequently led to bloodshed, despite attempts by the Rhode Island leadership to broker peace. During King Philip's War (1675–1676), both sides regularly violated Rhode Island's neutrality. The war's largest battle occurred in Rhode Island on December 19, 1675 when a force of Massachusetts, Connecticut, and Plymouth militia under General Josiah Winslow invaded and destroyed the fortified Narragansett village in the Great Swamp. The Narragansetts also invaded and burned several towns in Rhode Island, including Providence. Roger Williams knew both Metacom (Philip) and Canonchet as children. He was aware of the tribe's activities and promptly sent letters informing the Governor of Massachusetts of enemy movements. Providence Plantations made some efforts at fortifying the town, and Williams even started training recruits for protection. In one of the final actions of the war, troops from Connecticut killed King Philip (Metacom) in Mount Hope, Rhode Island.

Dominion of New England
In the 1680s, Charles II sought to streamline administration of the English colonies and to more closely control their trade. The Navigation Acts passed in the 1660s were widely disliked, since merchants often found themselves trapped and at odds with the rules. However, many colonial governments refused to enforce the acts, Massachusetts principally among them, and Massachusetts took matters one step further by obstructing the activities of the Crown agents. Charles' successor James II introduced the Dominion of New England in 1686 as a means to accomplish these goals. Under its provisional president Joseph Dudley, the disputed "King's Country" (now Washington County) was brought into the dominion, and the rest of the colony was brought under dominion control by Governor Sir Edmund Andros. The rule of Andros was extremely unpopular, especially in Massachusetts. The 1688 Glorious Revolution deposed James II and brought William III and Mary II to the English throne; Massachusetts authorities conspired in April 1689 to have Andros arrested and sent back to England. With this event, the dominion collapsed and Rhode Island resumed its previous government.

The bedrock of the economy continued to be fishing and agriculture, especially dairy farming; lumber and shipbuilding also became major industries. Slaves were introduced at this time, although there is no record of any law re-legalizing slave holding. Ironically, the colony later prospered under the slave trade, by distilling rum to sell in Africa as part of a profitable triangular trade in slaves and sugar between Africa, America, and the Caribbean.

American Revolutionary period

Rhode Island was the first of the Thirteen Colonies to take up arms against Great Britain in the Gaspee Affair, when an armed group of men attacked and burned a British Navy ship. This impromptu attack occurred in June, 1772, more than a year before the more famous Boston Tea Party. 

Leading figures in the colony were involved in the 1776 launch of the American Revolutionary War which delivered American independence from the British Empire, such as former royal governors Stephen Hopkins and Samuel Ward, as well as John Brown, Nicholas Brown, William Ellery, the Reverend James Manning, and the Reverend Ezra Stiles, each of whom had played an influential role in founding Brown University in Providence in 1764 as a sanctuary for religious and intellectual freedom.

On May 4, 1776, Rhode Island became the first of the 13 colonies to renounce its allegiance to the British Crown, and was the fourth to ratify the Articles of Confederation among the newly sovereign states on February 9, 1778. It boycotted the 1787 convention that drew up the United States Constitution, and initially refused to ratify it. It relented after Congress sent a series of constitutional amendments to the states for ratification, the Bill of Rights guaranteeing specific personal freedoms and rights, clear limitations on the government's power in judicial and other proceedings, and explicit declarations that all powers not specifically delegated to Congress by the Constitution are reserved for the states or the people. On May 29, 1790, Rhode Island became the 13th state and the last of the former colonies to ratify the Constitution.

Boundaries
The boundaries of the colony underwent numerous changes, including repeated disputes with Massachusetts and Connecticut Colonies who contested for control of territory later awarded to Rhode Island. Rhode Island's early compacts did not stipulate the boundary on the eastern shore of Narrangansett Bay, and did not include any of Washington County, land that belonged to the Narragansett people. The original settlements were at Providence, Warwick, Newport, and Portsmouth, and the territory was expanded by purchasing land from the Narragansetts westward toward Connecticut and the smaller islands in Narrangasett Bay. Block Island was settled in 1637 after the Pequot War, became a part of the colony in 1664, and was incorporated in 1672 as New Shoreham.

Western boundary

The western boundary with Connecticut was defined ambiguously as the "Narragansett River" in the Connecticut charter, which was decided by arbitrators in 1663 to be the Pawcatuck River from its mouth to the Ashaway River mouth, from which a northward line was drawn to the Massachusetts line. This resolved a long-standing dispute concerning the former Narragansett lands which were also claimed by Connecticut and Massachusetts, although the dispute continued until 1703, when the arbitration award was upheld. After repeated surveys, a mutually agreeable line was defined and surveyed in 1728.

Eastern boundary
The eastern boundary was also an area of dispute with Massachusetts. Overlapping charters had awarded an area extending three miles inland to both Plymouth and Rhode Island east of Narragansett Bay; this area was awarded to Rhode Island in 1741, establishing Rhode Island's jurisdiction over Barrington, Warren, Bristol, Tiverton, and Little Compton which Massachusetts had claimed. Also adjudicated in the 1741 decision was the award of most of Cumberland to Rhode Island from Massachusetts. The final establishment of the boundaries north of Barrington and east of the Blackstone River occurred almost a century after American independence, requiring protracted litigation and multiple U.S. Supreme Court decisions. In the final decision, a portion of Tiverton was awarded to Massachusetts to become part of Fall River, and 2/3 of Seekonk (Now eastern Pawtucket and East Providence) was awarded to Rhode Island in 1862.

Northern boundary
Rhode Island's northern border with Massachusetts also underwent a number of changes. Massachusetts surveyed this line in 1642, but subsequent surveys by Massachusetts, Rhode Island, and Connecticut agreed that it was placed too far south. In 1718-19, commissioners for Rhode Island and Massachusetts agreed on roughly that line anyway (except the section east of the Blackstone River, which remained disputed until 1741), and this is where the line remains today.

Demographics

From 1640 to 1774, the population of Rhode Island grew from 300 to 59,607, but then declined during the American Revolutionary War to 52,946 in 1780. William Coddington and a group of 13 other men bought Aquidneck Island from the Narragansett Indians in 1639, and the population of Newport, Rhode Island grew from 96 in 1640 to 7,500 in 1760 (making Newport the fifth-largest city in the Thirteen Colonies at the time), and Newport grew further to 9,209 by 1774. The black population in the colony grew from 25 in 1650 to 3,668 in 1774 (ranging between 3 and 10 percent of the population), and like the state as a whole, declined to 2,671 (or 5 percent of the population) by 1780. In 1774, Narragansetts accounted for 1,479 of the inhabitants of the colony (or three percent).

Rhode Island was the only New England colony without an established church. Rhode Island had only four churches with regular services in 1650, out of the 109 places of worship with regular services in the New England Colonies (including those without resident clergy), while there was a small Jewish enclave in Newport by 1658. Following the First Great Awakening (1730–1755), the number of regular places of worship in Rhode Island grew to 50 in 1750 (30 Baptist, 12 Congregational, 7 Anglican, and 1 Jewish), with the colony gaining an additional 5 regular places of worship by 1776 (26 Baptist, 11 Friends, 9 Congregational, 5 Episcopal, 1 Jewish, 1 New Light Congregational, 1 Presbyterian, and 1 Sandemanian).

Puritan mass migration to New England began following the issuance of the royal charter for the Massachusetts Bay Company by Charles I of England in 1629 and continued until the beginning of the English Civil War in 1642. The immigration leveled off following the war's conclusion in 1651, and the population growth owed almost entirely to natural increase rather than immigration or slave importations for the remainder of the 17th century and through the 18th century. Mass migration from New England to the Province of New York and the Province of New Jersey began following the surrender of New Netherland by the Dutch Republic at Fort Amsterdam in 1664, and the population of New York continued to expand by families moving from New England in the 18th century rather than from natural increase.

Most Puritan immigrants to New England moved as families, as approximately two-thirds of the male Puritan immigrants to New England were married rather than unmarried indentured servants. By the American Revolutionary War, only two percent of the New England colonial labor force were bonded or convict laborers and another two percent were black slaves, while nine percent of the colonial black population in New England were free, as compared with only three percent in the Southern Colonies. In February 1784, the Rhode Island General Assembly passed a gradual emancipation law that increased the ratio of the free black population in Rhode Island to 78 percent by the 1790 U.S. Census; slavery was completely eliminated in Rhode Island by 1842.

See also
 American Revolutionary War §Background and political developments. The 1772 Gaspee Affair in sequence and strategic context.
 British America
 List of colonial governors of Rhode Island

Citations

General and cited references 
 
 
 James, Sydney V. (1975). Colonial Rhode Island: A History.
 
 

 
Rhode Island and Providence Plantations, Colony of
Dominion of New England
Rhode Island and Providence Plantations, Colony of
Rhode Island and Providence Plantations, Colony of
Pre-statehood history of Rhode Island
States and territories established in 1636
1776 disestablishments in the British Empire
Rhode Island and Providence Plantations, Colony of
1636 establishments in the British Empire
Rhode Island